Zakryshkino is a rural locality (a village) in Leskovskoye Rural Settlement, Vologodsky District, Vologda Oblast, Russia. The population was 37 as of 2002.

Geography 
Zakryshkino is located 16 km southwest of Vologda (the district's administrative centre) by road. Smolyevo is the nearest rural locality.

References 

Rural localities in Vologodsky District